is a former Japanese football player.

Playing career
Watanabe was born in Iwaki on March 15, 1982. After graduating from high school, he joined newly was promoted to J1 League club, Kawasaki Frontale in 2000. However he could not play at all in the match in 2000 and the club was relegated to J2 League from 2001. He played many matches as defensive midfielder from 2001. In 2003, he was converted to center back and became a regular player. However his opportunity to play decreased from 2004. Although the club won the champions in 2004 and was promoted to J1 from 2005, he could hardly play in the match in J1. In 2006, he moved to J2 club Montedio Yamagata. He became a regular player as defensive midfielder. Although his opportunity to play decreased from summer 2007, the club was promoted to J1 first time in the club history from 2009. He played many matches as substitute midfielder. In 2010, he moved to Roasso Kumamoto and played many matches. In 2011, he moved to Japan Football League club Matsumoto Yamaga FC. He played many matches and the club was promoted to J2 from 2012. In 2013, he moved to J2 club Yokohama FC. However he could not play many matches in 3 seasons. In 2016, he moved to his local club Fukushima United FC in J3 League. He played many matches as defensive midfielder and retired end of 2017 season.

Club statistics

References

External links

Profile at Fukushima United FC

1982 births
Living people
Association football people from Fukushima Prefecture
Japanese footballers
J1 League players
J2 League players
J3 League players
Japan Football League players
Kawasaki Frontale players
Montedio Yamagata players
Roasso Kumamoto players
Matsumoto Yamaga FC players
Yokohama FC players
Fukushima United FC players
Association football midfielders